Mighty Mike is a computer-animated television series created by Guillaume Hellouin. The series is a co-production between French studio TeamTO and Canadian studio Digital Dimension, produced in association with France Télévisions, Super RTL, UYoung, Radio-Canada and Family Channel, and Cake Entertainment handling worldwide distribution.

Broadcast 
The series airs on Boomerang in France. In 2019 it was announced that the show would air on CITV and Boomerang in the United Kingdom, as well as Universal Kids in the United States and ABC Me in Australia

Plot 
The series follows Mike, a pug, as he tries to gain the affection of his canine neighbour, whilst clashing with two mischievous raccoons.

Characters 
Mike is a refined and sophisticated pug who is responsible for defending his house from two mischievous raccoons and three troublesome turtles. He also needs to protect little Fluffy the Cat from any danger whatsoever.
Fluffy is a small orange kitten who is the second pet of Mike's owners, the Mikkelsen Family. Though he's still a kitten, he is always seen wandering off on his own or causing little havoc around the house, which sometimes leads to Mike's overprotectiveness of him.
Iris is a white female Chinese Crested Dog who serves as Mike's love interest (and his many attempts to impress her). When enraged, Iris uses her tail to swat objects. She uses it on the raccoons when they try to steal things from Mike and herself.
Athos, Porthos, and Aramis are three lively turtles who like playing sports, especially baseball, in spite of their species. Their names are a reference to The Three Musketeers. 
Freddy and Mercury are two mischievous raccoons who are always causing mischief in every episode. Freddy is the leader of the duo, and always assisting Mercury to do things his own way. Both names are a play on the former British singer-songwriter, Freddie Mercury.
Iris' owner - They play the role of being the owner of Iris and persuading her to look after her stuff while they're gone.
The Mikkelsen Family are a family of unseen humans and the owners of Mike, Fluffy, Athos, Porthos, and Aramis. In a few episodes, they are heard and their feet and legs are briefly seen. The family consists of Stephan (the father), Laura (the mother), Louise (eldest child/daughter), and Tom (youngest child/son).

References

External links 
 Mighty Mike at IMDB

2010s Canadian animated television series
2020s Canadian animated television series
2019 Canadian television series debuts
2010s French animated television series
2020s French animated television series
2019 French television series debuts
Canadian children's animated comedy television series
Canadian computer-animated television series
French children's animated comedy television series
French computer-animated television series
Animated television series about dogs
Animated television series about cats
Animated television series about turtles
Television series about raccoons
Fictional dogs